All My Favorite Singers Are Willie Nelson is an album by Astral Swans, released in 2015 by Dan Mangan's Madic Records, an imprint of Arts & Crafts Productions. All My Favorite Singers Are Willie Nelson, was described by VICE  as "a stark, beautiful project [...] steeped in 60s psych-folk mythology and loner punk iconography."

Track listing 
 "There Are Ways To Get What You Want"
 "Beginning Of The End"
 "Let Their Faces All Blur Out'
 "Please Don’t Leave Me Strange"
 "What Calms You Down, Freaks Me Out"
 "You Carry A Sickness"
 "Park Street"
 "September"
 "Holly"
 "My Conscience Don’t Work In The New World"
 "Attention"
 "Grass Girl"

Personnel 
Matthew Swann – all instruments and vocals except
Chris Reimer – track 7 sample taken from: Truck Middle from 'The Chad Tape', 2012
Distance Bullock – drums on tracks 2,4,6,8,11, BG vocals on track 1,2. cello throughout
Kaelen Ohm – drums on track 5
Kevin Stebner – drums on track 9
Paul Chirka – violin on track 1
All Songs Recorded by Brad Hawkins except tracks 3, and 9 recorded by Lorrie Matheson
Additional overdubs by Matthew Swann
Mixed by Gabriel Alan Collins, Matthew Swann, Brad Hawkins,
Mastered by Ron Skinner at Heading North Mastering

References 

2015 albums
Astral Swans albums
Arts & Crafts Productions albums